Nixville is an unincorporated community in Hampton County, South Carolina, United States.

On April 13, 2020, a tornado measuring EF4 on the Enhanced Fujita Scale traveled across Hampton County, striking Nixville along its path. The tornado, which was part of the 2020 Easter tornado outbreak, killed five people in the Nixville and Estill vicinities and caused a significant amount of property damage.

See also 
List of F4 and EF4 tornadoes (2020–present)

References

Unincorporated communities in Hampton County, South Carolina
Unincorporated communities in South Carolina